Jeyes Fluid  is a brand of disinfectant fluid  for external use only. It is predominantly used for removing bacteria, while gardeners have found it effective at cleaning paths, patios, greenhouses, driveways, and drains - particularly of moss. With cautious use, it can also remove weeds.

The product was patented by John Jeyes in 1877, and   granted a Royal Warrant to the British Royal Family in 1896.

While no longer used for this purpose, Jeyes Fluid has been used in historical medical treatments. Dr. William Robert Woodman, attributes low death rates for cases of scarlet fever to interventions, including

"...that patients are given frequent warm baths, beginning at the end of the first week. Warm baths with some Jeyes' fluid in them are used, the latter preventing the spread of the infection."

The first television ad for Jeyes Fluid was not until 2011, when a £500,000 advertising campaign was aired in the UK over the Easter bank holiday.

Composition 

It has a pH between 8.0 and 10.0 (moderately alkaline).

References

External links 
 Company history
 Safety data sheets are available from www.jeyesprofessional.co.uk
 Jeyes Fluid 1L x 6 (JP) safety data sheet 
 Jeyes Fluid 5L x 4 (JP) safety data sheet 
 Product fact sheet

British brands
1877 introductions
Companies based in Norfolk
Cleaning product brands
Disinfectants
Household and personal product companies of the United Kingdom